Lishui County may refer to:

Lishui District, formerly Lishui County (溧水县), Jiangsu, China
Liandu District, formerly Lishui County (丽水县), Zhejiang, China